Ivesia saxosa is a species of flowering plant in the rose family known by the common name rock mousetail, or rock ivesia. It is native to the mountains and deserts of central and southern California and northern Baja California, where it grows in cracks and crevices in rock faces and slopes. This is a clumpy perennial herb with hanging leaves and stems. Each leaf is a flat strip or cluster of rounded, lobed leaflets. The green to reddish stem is up to 30 centimeters long and bears an inflorescence of clustered flowers. Each flower is almost a centimeter wide and has hairy pointed sepals and smaller rounded to spoon-shaped yellow petals. In the center of the flower are up to 40 stamens and many pistils. The fruit is a tiny pale achene.

External links
Jepson Manual Treatment
Photo gallery

saxosa
Flora of Baja California
Flora of California
Flora without expected TNC conservation status